Maurice Dugowson (23 September 1938 – 11 November 1999) was a French film director and screenwriter. His 1975 film Lily, aime-moi was entered into the 25th Berlin International Film Festival. The following year, his film F comme Fairbanks was entered into the 26th Berlin International Film Festival. In 1981 his film Bye, See You Monday was entered into the 12th Moscow International Film Festival.

Selected filmography
 Lily, aime-moi (1975)
 F comme Fairbanks (1976)
 Bye, See You Monday (1979)
  (1983)
 Blind Spot (1995)
 El Che (1997)

References

External links

1938 births
1999 deaths
French film directors
French male screenwriters
20th-century French screenwriters
20th-century French male writers